George Leonard (c. 1655 - c.1735) was a British colonial governor. He was Deputy Governor of Anguilla from 1689 until around 1735.

References

Deputy Governors of Anguilla
1650s births
1730s deaths